Ballymoyer or Ballymyre is a civil parish in the historic barony of Fews Upper, County Armagh, Northern Ireland, 3 miles north-east of Newtownhamilton.

Places of interest
Ballymoyer House and estate, once the seat of Sir Walter Synnot (1742-1821), is a National Trust property open to the public.
Ballymoyer Woodland, an area of mixed woodland open to the public.
The walls of the original church of St Luke's were erected in the reign of Charles I but remained unroofed, due to the murder of the appointed clergyman, until 1775, when Archbishop Robinson commissioned it to be finished. The present church was then built in 1822 with the help of a donation of £900 from the late Board of First Fruits. The nearby glebe-house was built in 1825 with a loan from the Board.

Education
The local primary school is St Malachy's and it is situated beside St Malachy's chapel.

Civil parish of Ballymyre
The civil parish contains the village of Whitecross.

Townlands
The civil parish contains the following townlands:

Aghincurk
Ballinatate
Ballintemple
Cavanakill
Corlat
Knockavannon
Lurgana
Outleckan

See also
List of civil parishes of County Armagh
Florence MacMoyer

References